The Ocean Man First Nation ( kihcikamîwiyin) is an Assiniboine, Cree, and Saulteaux band government in southeastern Saskatchewan, Canada.  Chief Kitchi-Kah-Me-Win (Great Seaman or Ocean Man, also spelt Kicheekahmenin, Kickekamewin)( kihcikamîwiyin) signed Treaty 4 on September 9, 1875.

According to 2016 Statistics Canada "Population Profile", there were 215 on-reserve residents, about half of which were Cree, and about another half were Assiniboine.

Reserves
 Ocean Man 69
 Ocean Man 69A
 Ocean Man 69B
 Ocean Man 69C
 Ocean Man 69D
 Ocean Man 69E
 Ocean Man 69F
 Ocean Man 69G
 Ocean Man 69H
 Ocean Man 69I
 Ocean Man 69N
 Ocean Man 69S
 Ocean Man 69U
 Ocean Man 69X
 Ocean Man 69Q (New land added to the First Nation, just outside Regina)
 Treaty Four Reserve Grounds 77 (shared between 33 First Nations)

References

First Nations in Saskatchewan